Bollion is a village lying within the municipality of Lully, in the  canton of Fribourg, Switzerland. It formerly existed as an autonomous municipality, but on 1 January 2006 was merged with Seiry, into the larger Lully.

References

Former municipalities of the canton of Fribourg
Villages in the canton of Fribourg